The 2000 William Jones Cup (23rd tournament) took place in Taipei from 13 July–29 July.

Standings

Results
Preliminary Round

Semifinals

Finals

References

2000
2000 in Taiwanese sport
2000–01 in Asian basketball
2000–01 in North American basketball
2000 in New Zealand basketball
2000 in African basketball